Finland competed at the 1992 Summer Olympics in Barcelona, Spain. 88 competitors, 60 men and 28 women, took part in 85 events in 16 sports.

Medalists

Competitors
The following is the list of number of competitors in the Games.

Archery

The Finnish team sent only men to the 1992 archery tournament.  Individually, only Jari Lipponen had much success, taking eighth place after losing in the quarterfinal.  As a team, however, the Finnish men were very successful, losing the final match to Spain by only two points to finish with a silver medal.

Men's Individual Competition:
 Jari Lipponen — Quarterfinal, 8th place (2-1)
 Tomi Poikolainen — Round of 32, 24th place (0-1)
 Ismo Falck — Ranking round, 57th place (0-0)

Men's Team Competition:
 Lipponen, Poikolainen, and Falck — Final (→   Silver Medal)

Athletics

Men's 5,000 metres
Risto Ulmala
 Heat — 13:52.52 (→ did not advance)

Men's 10,000 metres
Risto Ulmala
 Heat — did not finish (→ no ranking)

Men's Marathon
 Harri Hänninen — 2:15.19 (→ 11th place)

Men's 110m Hurdles
 Arto Bryggare 
 Heats — 13.92 (→ did not advance)

Men's 50 km Walk
Valentin Kononen — 3:57:21 (→ 7th place)

Men's Javelin Throw
Seppo Räty 
 Qualification — 80.24 m
 Final — 86.60 m (→  Silver Medal)
Kimmo Kinnunen 
 Qualification — 80.22 m
 Final — 82.62 m (→ 4th place)
Juha Laukkanen 
 Qualification — 79.78 m
 Final — 79.20 m (→ 6th place)

Men's Shot Put
Antero Paljakka 
 Qualification — 18.42 m (→ did not advance)

Women's 10,000 metres
Päivi Tikkanen
 Heat — did not finish (→ did not advance)

Women's 10 km Walk
Sari Essayah — 45:08 (→ 4th place)

Women's Marathon
 Ritva Lemettinen — 2:41.48 (→ 14th place)

Women's Heptathlon
 Tina Rättyä 
 Final Result — 5993 points (→ 20th place)
 Satu Marianne Ruotsalainen 
 Final Result — did not finish (→ no ranking)

Badminton

Boxing

Canoeing

Cycling

Two cyclists, one man and one woman, represented Finland in 1992.

Men's 1 km time trial
 Mika Hämäläinen

Women's road race
 Tea Vikstedt-Nyman — 2:05:03 (→ 25th place)

Women's individual pursuit
 Tea Vikstedt-Nyman

Equestrianism

Judo

Rhythmic gymnastics

Rowing

Sailing

Men's 470 Class
Petri Leskinen and Mika Aarnikka
 Final Ranking — 69.7 points (→ 4th place)

Women's 470 Class
Katri Laike and Anna-Marita Slunga
 Final Ranking — 89.7 points (→ 10th place)

Shooting

Swimming

Men's 50 m Freestyle
 Janne Blomqvist
 Heat – 23.63 (→ did not advance, 30th place)

Men's 100 m Freestyle
 Janne Blomqvist
 Heat – 51.86 (→ did not advance, 38th place)

Men's 200 m Freestyle
 Antti Kasvio
 Heat – 1:48.31 
 Final – 1:47.63 (→  Bronze Medal)
 Vesa Hanski
 Heat – 1:53.17 (→ did not advance, 28th place)

Men's 400 m Freestyle
 Antti Kasvio
 Heat – 3:51.74 
 B-Final – 3:50.06 (→ 9th place)

Men's 100 m Breaststroke
 Petri Suominen
 Heat – 1:03.75 (→ did not advance, 24th place)

Men's 200 m Breaststroke
 Petri Suominen
 Heat – 2:18.01 (→ did not advance, 22nd place)
 Petteri Lehtinen
 Heat – 2:20.27 (→ did not advance, 27th place)

Men's 100 m Butterfly
 Jani Sievinen
 Heat – 54.57
 B-Final – 54.93 (→ 13th place)
 Vesa Hanski
 Heat – 55.81 (→ did not advance, 31st place)

Men's 200 m Butterfly
 Vesa Hanski
 Heat – 2:02.75 (→ did not advance, 31st place)
 Kristian Johansson
 Heat – 2:05.71 (→ did not advance, 36th place)

Men's 200 m Individual Medley
 Jani Sievinen
 Heat – 2:01.18
 Final – 2:01.28 (→ 4th place)
 Petteri Lehtinen
 Heat – 2:05.65 (→ did not advance, 21st place)

Men's 400 m Individual Medley
 Petteri Lehtinen
 Heat – 4:22.10
 B-Final – 4:22.10 (→ 12th place)

Men's 4 × 100 m Freestyle Relay
 Jani Sievinen, Janne Vermasheina, Janne Blomqvist, and Vesa Hanski
 Heat – 3:25.47 (→ did not advance, 12th place)

Women's 50 m Freestyle
 Minna Salmela
 Heat – 27.00 (→ did not advance, 31st place)
 Marja Pärssinen
 Heat – 27.49 (→ did not advance, 38th place)

Women's 100 m Freestyle
 Minna Salmela
 Heat – 58.04 (→ did not advance, 24th place)
 Marja Pärssinen
 Heat – 59.46 (→ did not advance, 38th place)

Women's 100 m Backstroke
 Anne Lackman
 Heat – 1:06.48 (→ did not advance, 39th place)

Women's 100 m Breaststroke
 Riikka Ukkola
 Heat – 1:15.56 (→ did not advance, 35th place)

Women's 100 m Butterfly
 Marja Pärssinen
 Heat – 1:03.94 (→ did not advance, 32nd place)

Synchronized swimming

One synchronized swimmer represented Finland in 1992.

Women's solo
Liisa Laurila

Weightlifting

Men's Lightweight
Jouni Grönman

Men's Middle-Heavyweight
Keijo Tahvanainen
Janne Kanerva

Men's Heavyweight
Arto Savonen

Wrestling

Men's Flyweight (Greco-Roman)
Ismo Kamesaki

Men's Bantamweight (Greco-Roman)
Keijo Pehkonen

Men's Welterweight (Greco-Roman)
Tuomo Karila

Men's Middleweight (Greco-Roman)
Timo Niemi

Men's Light-Heavyweight (Greco-Roman)
Harri Koskela

Men's Super-Heavyweight (Greco-Roman)
Juha Ahokas

Men's Middleweight (Freestyle)
Pekka Rauhala

References

Nations at the 1992 Summer Olympics
1992
S